Cropp is the surname of the following people:
Ben Cropp (born 1936), Australian documentary filmmaker, conservationist and spearfisher
Dave Cropp (1876–?), American football and baseball coach
Jack Cropp (1927–2016), New Zealand yachtsman
Linda W. Cropp (born 1947), American politician
Wolf-Ulrich Cropp (born 1941), German writer and businessman